Bouyei can refer to:

Bouyei language
Bouyei people

Language and nationality disambiguation pages